Bethanie Mattek-Sands and Lucie Šafářová were the defending champions, but Šafářová withdrew before the tournament due to a bacterial infection. Mattek-Sands played alongside Sabine Lisicki, but lost in the second round to Anastasia and Arina Rodionova. 

Top seeds Martina Hingis and Sania Mirza won the title, defeating Andrea Hlaváčková and Lucie Hradecká in the final, 7–6(7–1), 6–3.

Seeds

Draw

Finals

Top half

Section 1

Section 2

Bottom half

Section 3

Section 4

External links
 2016 Australian Open – Women's draws and results at the International Tennis Federation

Women's Doubles
Australian Open (tennis) by year – Women's doubles
2016 in Australian women's sport